Macellomenia is a genus of solenogaster, and the only genus in its family.

The type species is Paramenia palifera Pruvot, 1890

Species
 Macellomenia aciculata Scheltema, 1999
 Macellomenia adenota Salvini-Plawen, 2003
 Macellomenia morseae Kocot & Todt, 2014
 Macellomenia palifera (Pruvot, 1890)
 Macellomenia schanderi Kocot & Todt, 2014

References

 Simroth H. (1893). Aplacophora [in] Bronn, H. G. Klassen und Ordnunger des Thier-Reichs 3 (1): 128-233 pl. 1-4

Pholidoskepia